In needlework, a slip is a design representing a cutting or specimen of a plant, usually with flowers or fruit and leaves on a stem. Most often, slip refers to a plant design stitched in canvaswork (pettipoint), cut out, and applied to a woven background fabric. By extension, slip may also mean any embroidered or canvaswork motif, floral or not, mounted to fabric in this way.

Isolated motifs arranged in rows are common in English embroidery from the 14th to the 17th centuries, and small floral slips were the most popular.

Technique and inspiration
The name slip as used in needlework derives from the horticultural sense, where it describes a cutting of a plant used for grafting.

Canvaswork floral slips and other motifs appliquéd to a woven background fabric such as velvet or damask became common in England from the mid-14th century, replacing the all-over embroidery of Opus Anglicanum. These were worked with silk thread in tent stitch on linen canvas, cut out, and applied to the ground fabric, often with an outline and embellishments of couched thread or cord or other embroidery.  Slips were also appliquéd of rich fabrics on plainer ones, similarly detailed with couched cord and embroidery. This style of decoration is characteristic of later medieval ecclesiastical embroidery (and probably of domestic embroidery as well, although little of this survives).  Following the dissolution of the monasteries during the English Reformation, rich vestments were cut up and the fabrics and motifs reused to make secular furnishings.  Appliquéd slips of both old fabric and new canvaswork are characteristic of domestic textiles such as chair covers, cushions, and especially wall hangings and bed curtains throughout the Elizabethan and Jacobean eras.

Elizabethan slips were based on the woodcut illustrations in herbals and flower paintings, such as Jacques Le Moyne's La Clef de Champs, William Turner's A New Herball (published in three parts, 1551-1568), Henry Lyte's A niewe Herball (1578), and John Gerard's Great Herbal (1597), and were intentionally naturalistic.  By the first quarter of the 17th century, simpler designs for slips were being published in books of patterns specifically for embroidery, like Richard Shorleyker's A Scholehouse for the Needle (1632).

Slip motifs are also seen in blackwork embroidery, worked in silk, and in Jacobean embroidery and crewel embroidery in silk and wool.

Notes

References
Beck, The Embroiderer's Story. Newton Abbott, Devon: David & Charles, 1995, 
Digby, George Wingfield. Elizabethan Embroidery. New York: Thomas Yoseloff, 1964.
Holme, Charles, editor: Art In England during the Elizabethan and Stuart Periods by Aymer Vallance, London, Paris, and New York: Offices of The Studio, 1908, PDF at https://archive.org/details/artinenglandduri00valluoft
Hughes, Therle, English Domestic Needlework, London: Abbey Fine Arts Press (no date, no ISBN)
Levey, S. M. and D. King, The Victoria and Albert Museum's Textile Collection Vol. 3: Embroidery in Britain from 1200 to 1750, Victoria and Albert Museum, 1993, 
Levey, Santina M.: Elizabethan Treasures: The Hardwick Hall Textiles, New York: Harry N Abrams, 1998,

External links
A Scholehouse for the Needle by Richard Schorleyker, 1632 

Needlework